Notocrater pustulosus is a species of small sea snail, a marine gastropod mollusk in the family Pseudococculinidae, the false limpets.

Distribution
This species occurs in the Pacific Ocean off Japan.

References

 Thiele J. (1925). Gastropoden der Deutschen Tiefsee-Expedition. II Teil. Wissenschaftliche Ergebnisse der Deutschen Tiefsee-Expedition auf dem Dampfer "Valdivia" 1898-1899. 17(2): 35-382, pls 13-46
 Habe T. (1958). Descriptions of ten new gastropod species. Venus. 20(1): 32-42

External links
 To Barcode of Life (1 barcode)
 To GenBank (2 nucleotides; 2 proteins)
 To World Register of Marine Species

Pseudococculinidae
Gastropods described in 1925